Roma Eterna is a science fiction fixup novel by American writer Robert Silverberg, published in 2003, which presents an alternative history in which the Roman Empire survives to the present day. Each of the ten chapters was first published as a short story, six of them in Asimov's Science Fiction, between 1989 and 2003.

Plot introduction
The point of divergence is the failure of the Israelite Exodus from Egypt. Moses and many of the Israelites drowned, and the remnant, led by Aaron, were fetched back to slavery in Egypt, a traumatic event recorded for posterity in the Book of Aaron, an alternate version of the Bible. Later, the Hebrews were freed from bondage and remained a distinct religious-ethnic minority in Egypt, practicing a monotheistic religion, up to the equivalent of our 20th century (the 27th century of the Roman calendar).

Still, affairs of the larger world and the rise and fall of empires and cultures  remained roughly the same as in our history until the division of the Roman Empire, which was never Christianised in this history. Mutual assistance between the Western and the Eastern Roman Empire against barbarian invasions preserved both from falling and kept Roman rule intact throughout the imperial dominions.

Despite the absence of Christianity, which, in our history, considerably influenced early Islam, Muhammad still started his prophetic career but was assassinated by a perceptive Roman agent, nipping Islam in the bud and thus precluding the spread of any monotheistic religion through the Roman Empire. Monotheism remained limited to the specific Hebrew sect in Egypt.

Plot summary
Others describe the first Roman circumnavigation of the world and unsuccessful attempts to conquer Nova Roma (Central America).

Many features of our own history are repeated in this history, though under changed circumstances: the equivalent of the 16th and 17th centuries have bold navigators and adventurers, romanticised by later generations but unpleasantly brutal and ruthless when looked at closely; in the late 18th to mid-19th centuries, a decadent old order is overthrown by revolution followed by a reign of terror and the reemergence of Republicanism; though Italy remains a central part of the Roman Empire, the Latin dialect spoken there develops into a kind of Italian, and the name "Marcus" changes into "Marco"; though Vienna is a provincial capital which never had an Emperor of its own, its population dances the Waltz; by the 20th century, people travel by cars rather than carriages and by the second half of the century, space flight is achieved.

It concludes with the first story to be written, when a group of Hebrew citizens in Alexandria prepare to depart Earth in a rocket which explodes shortly after takeoff.  But they will try again, still believing God chose them to inherit the Promised Land, just not on Rome-dominated Earth.

Chapters
The book consists of a prologue and ten chapters (Gregorian calendar year):
 AUC 1203: Prologue (AD 450)
 AUC 1282: With Caesar in the Underworld (529)
 AUC 1365: A Hero of the Empire (612)
 AUC 1861: The Second Wave (1108)
 AUC 1951: Waiting for the End (1198)
 AUC 2206: An Outpost of the Realm (1453)
 AUC 2543: Getting to know the Dragon (1790)
 AUC 2568: The Reign of Terror (1815)
 AUC 2603: Via Roma (1850)
 AUC 2650: Tales from the Venia Woods (1897)
 AUC 2723: To the Promised Land (1970)

Literary significance and reception
The book received a share of negative criticism. It was accused of concentrating too much on the upper class and not drawing a detailed picture of Roman life and its change through the ages. The only story in the book to receive true praise from reviewer Alma A. Hromic is the last chapter, To the Promised Land, which incidentally, does not deal with Romans or the upper class of the Empire.

Publication history

As short stories
Original short stories first publication.
 "To the Promised Land" (Omni, May 1989)
 "Tales from the Venia Woods" (The Magazine of Fantasy & Science Fiction, October 1989)
 "An Outpost of the Empire" (Isaac Asimov's Science Fiction Magazine, November 1991)
 "Via Roma" (Asimov's Science Fiction, April 1994)
 "Waiting for the End" (Asimov's Science Fiction, October/November 1998) 
 "Getting to Know the Dragon" (Far Horizons: All New Tales from the Greatest Worlds of Science Fiction, May 1999)
 "A Hero of the Empire" (The Magazine of Fantasy & Science Fiction, October–November 1999)
 "The Second Wave" (Asimov's Science Fiction, August 2002)
 "With Caesar in the Underworld" (Asimov's Science Fiction, October/November 2002)
 "The Reign of Terror" (Asimov's Science Fiction, April 2003)

As a single book
 Hardback
 June 2003, publisher: Eos, United States edition
 August 2003, publisher: Gollancz, UK edition

 Paperback
 April 2004, publisher: Eos, USA edition
 July 2004, publisher: Gollancz, UK edition

See also 
 Agent of Byzantium
 Germanicus trilogy
 Gunpowder Empire
 Lest Darkness Fall
 Romanitas/Rome Burning
 Warlords of Utopia

References

External links 
 

2003 American novels
2003 science fiction novels
Alternate_history_novels
Alternate history novels set in ancient Rome
American alternate history novels
American science fiction novels
Novels by Robert Silverberg
Novels set in the Byzantine Empire
Works originally published in Asimov's Science Fiction